Francis J. "Reds" Bagnell (September 15, 1928 – July 10, 1995) was an American football halfback in college. He was an All-American tailback for the University of Pennsylvania, from which he graduated in 1951. He won the Maxwell Award, was third for Heisman Trophy balloting, and was elected to the College Football Hall of Fame. Inducted in 1970 to the Pennsylvania Sports Hall of Fame. He served as president of the College Football Hall of Fame from 1990 till his death.

Bagnell passed up his chance to play in the NFL to enlist in the navy, where he served a 4-year stint as a naval officer.

He was appointed to the American Battle Monuments Commission by Ronald Reagan and George Herbert Walker Bush'''.

References

External links
 
 

1928 births
1995 deaths
American football halfbacks
Penn Quakers football players
College Football Hall of Fame inductees
Maxwell Award winners
Players of American football from Philadelphia